The South African Railways Class S 0-8-0 of 1929 was a steam locomotive.

In 1929, the South African Railways placed fourteen purpose-built  steam shunting locomotives with a 0-8-0 wheel arrangement in service.

Background
Throughout the history of railways in South Africa, shunting was traditionally performed by downgraded mainline locomotives. Considering the enormous amount of shunting performed, the number of dedicated shunting locomotives on the South African Railways (SAR) roster in the steam era was remarkably low, amounting to only 151 locomotives on a railway whose steam stock at one stage reached a maximum of nearly 2,800 locomotives.

When it did eventually introduce purpose-built shunting locomotives, the SAR preferred to adhere to the American practice of using tender locomotives for shunting rather than the European practice of using tank engines.

Manufacturer

In spite of the conversion of Class A tank locomotives to Class 17 tank-and-tender shunting locomotives, increasing rail traffic throughout the country and particularly on the Witwatersrand in the 1920s still made it necessary to use heavy mainline locomotives for shunting work. Specifications for the Class S 0-8-0 tender type steam shunting locomotive were therefore prepared by Colonel F.R. Collins DSO, Chief Mechanical Engineer of the SAR.

In 1928, fourteen locomotives were built to the SAR specifications by Henschel and Son in Germany. They were delivered in 1929 and numbered in the range from 360 to 373. Since they were designed to operate at low speeds in tightly curved shunting yards, there was no need for the leading or trailing wheels which are necessary on mainline locomotives to improve high speed stability. In addition, it was desirable to have as large a proportion of the engine weight as possible carried on the coupled wheels to obtain the maximum adhesion possible.

Characteristics
The Class S locomotives were superheated, were built on bar frames and used Walschaerts valve gear with piston valves. To improve the crew's rearward vision, the top sides of the tender's coal bunker were set inwards and the water tank top was rounded.

Service

South African Railways
The Class S was initially placed in service in the Orange Free State and Natal, but they were soon transferred to Transvaal where they spent most of the rest of their working lives, rendering good service in yards at several centres. The Class ended up being mainly a Western Transvaal locomotive, stationed at Germiston, Kaserne, Krugersdorp, Springs and at Beaconsfield in Kimberley, with a solitary locomotive at Volksrust. The bulk of them spent all their working lives in Braamfontein.

Industrial
They were withdrawn from SAR service in 1976. Four were sold to Dunn's in 1977, from where they eventually ended up at several locations.
 No. 362 went to Apex Mines at Greenside as no. 6.
 No. 365 went to Tweefontein United Colliery and later to Enyati Colliery.
 No. 367 went to Apex Mines as no. 5 and later to Grootvlei Proprietary Mines at Springs, first as no. 3 Big Mac and later renumbered to 2.
 No. 369 went to Grootvlei Proprietary Mines (GVPM), first as no. 2 King Kong and later renumbered to 1.

Preservation

Illustration

References

2170
2170
0-8-0 locomotives
D h2 locomotives
Henschel locomotives
Cape gauge railway locomotives
Railway locomotives introduced in 1929
1929 in South Africa